Gemini is a racing roller coaster with a wooden structure and steel track, located at Cedar Point in Sandusky, Ohio. Built in 1978 by Arrow Dynamics and designed by Ron Toomer, it is one of the oldest roller coasters in the park. When the ride opened, it was marketed as the tallest, fastest and steepest roller coaster in the world. All three record-breaking claims were falsely made as other coasters around the world already beat Gemini. The all-steel Loch Ness Monster at Busch Gardens in Williamsburg, Virginia, opened earlier that year before Gemini and was taller but had a shorter drop. Screamin' Eagle at Six Flags St. Louis opened two years prior to Gemini and was faster at 62 mph.

Ride experience

The structure is considered a steel hybrid due to the track's use of tubular steel which sits on a wooden support structure. Two trains, red and blue, are dispatched on two tracks that run side-by-side throughout most of the ride until briefly diverging into separate helices and coming back together to finish the ride.

Gemini has one of the highest capacities of any ride in the park. Gemini's station previously featured a double-sided entry, allowing guests to enter the station from both the front and the back. Eventually modified to have guests only enter from the back of the station, the stairway formerly used for the queue at the front of the station still remains. Originally, Gemini operated 3 trains on each side of the roller coaster for a total of 6 trains. Gemini currently operates with 4 trains (2 on each side).

References

External links

 Cedarpoint.com - Gemini Official Page
 POV of Gemini
 Gemini at The Point Online

Cedar Point
Roller coasters in Ohio
Roller coasters operated by Cedar Fair
Hybrid roller coasters